"Chain Gang" is an episode of the BBC sitcom, Only Fools and Horses. It was the third episode of series 6, and was first broadcast on 22 January 1989. In the episode, Del puts together a consortium to buy a set of 18 carat gold chains from a retired jeweller.

Synopsis
At the One-Eleven Club, Rodney introduces Cassandra to Del Boy. They also meet Arnie, a retired jeweller, who interests the Trotters in 250 eighteen-carat gold chains. Arnie explains that he acquired the chains several months ago for another man, Maxi Stavros, but has not heard from him since, and now he is willing to sell them for half their wholesale price. Del forms a consortium of himself, Rodney, Albert, Boycie, Trigger, and Mike, who purchase the chains for £12,500. However, seconds after the deal has gone through, Arnie calls his wife, who informs him that Mr. Stavros has made contact and now wishes to purchase the chains. Arnie is distraught as he has shaken on the deal, and worries about having to explain to Mr. Stavros that he has sold the chains. Del calms the situation down with an idea. Arnie will sell the chains to Stavros on the consortium's behalf for the original price of £25,000, with Arnie receiving £2,000, leaving the consortium with a healthy profit.

At an Italian restaurant, Arnie, with the briefcase containing the chains handcuffed to his wrist, sits down and waits for Stavros. Del and Boycie keep an eye on him from another table, while Rodney and Albert wait outside in the Trotters' van, backed up by Mike and Trigger, who are in Mike's car. Suddenly, Arnie starts to have a heart attack, and collapses on the floor. A sagacious Boycie realises if the chains and money accompany Arnie to the hospital they may lose them for good. So, impersonating a doctor, Boycie discreetly tries to get the case. A fellow diner spots this and punches Boycie. The restaurant's proprietor is about to call the police, but Del is able to save Boycie by pretending to be a police officer. An ambulance arrives and Arnie is taken to hospital. The group try to follow the ambulance in Mike's car, so they know which hospital to visit, only to find the car is in the process of being clamped. Rodney and Albert drive off in the van after the ambulance.

The consortium wait for news back at Nelson Mandela House. A short time later, Rodney and Albert return home to say that they lost the ambulance at a red traffic light. They then receive a call from a doctor who informs them that Arnie has died. The doctor is unable to give Del Arnie's address and hangs up. As no-one knows Arnie's surname and he was not a member of the One-Eleven Club, they are unable to trace him. Albert suggests that they use the redial button on the phone, as Arnie was the last person to use it when he phoned his wife. Del gives it a try, but comes up short and gets put through to the Highcliffe Hotel in Guernsey (Rodney had phoned to contact Cassandra). Now resigned to losing the gold chains for good, a despondent Mike, Boycie, and Trigger leave the flat.

A few days later, while picking up Cassandra at the airport, Rodney spots Arnie, this time in west London, being carried into an ambulance by two paramedics. At The Nag's Head, the consortium realise the truth: Arnie is a con man who tricks people into buying his gold chains, then fakes a heart attack and flees with the money and the chains. The group reason that Arnie's two sons Gary and Steven are also in on the scam and have acquired an old ambulance, which would be the perfect getaway vehicle for such deals; the disguise would allow Arnie and his sons to make the getaway without suspicion, and nobody can follow the ambulance through red lights. Del also says that he spoke to the manager of the Italian restaurant, who had told him that the real ambulance arrived shortly after Arnie's ambulance left. They then hear that Denzil and his brothers are about to become the latest victims of Arnie's scam, but Denzil leaves the Nag's Head before Del and Rodney can warn him about Arnie.

The next day, at an Indian restaurant, Denzil and his brother Carl are keeping an eye on Arnie from a nearby table. Meanwhile, Gary and Steven are standing by in their ambulance, waiting for Arnie to fake his heart attack. Arnie does so, but when he gets loaded into the ambulance, he finds himself surrounded by Del, Rodney, Albert, Mike, Boycie, and Trigger, all disguised as paramedics and having bought their own ambulance with which to capture Arnie. Once Arnie's sons arrive at the restaurant, they are apprehended by Denzil and his brothers. Arnie tries to reason with the group, as Albert passes Del a large pair of bolt cutters. Arnie says there is no need to cut the chain because he has the key. Del then remarks "Who said anything about cutting the chain off?". Arnie begins to wheeze, and Del quips that Arnie should calm down or else he may give himself a heart attack.

Episode cast

Music
 Mica Paris: "My One Temptation"
 Wet Wet Wet: "Sweet Little Mystery"

External links

Only Fools and Horses (series 6) episodes
1989 British television episodes